Arne Larsson (born 27 April 1931) is a Swedish former footballer who played as a defender. He made three appearances for Sweden.

References

Living people
1931 births
Association football defenders
Swedish footballers
Sweden international footballers
Allsvenskan players
Djurgårdens IF Fotboll players